Isochariesthes epupaensis is a species of beetle in the family Cerambycidae. It was described by Adlbauer in 2002. It is known from Namibia.

References

Endemic fauna of Namibia
epupaensis
Beetles described in 2002